The 1860 New South Wales colonial election was held between 6 December and 24 December 1860. This election was for all of the 72 seats in the New South Wales Legislative Assembly and it was conducted in 52 single-member constituencies, six 2-member constituencies and two 4-member constituencies, all with a first past the post system. Suffrage was limited to adult white males. This was the first election after the separation of Queensland in December 1859.

The previous parliament of New South Wales was dissolved on 10 November 1860 by the Governor, Sir William Denison, on the advice of the Premier, John Robertson.

There was no recognisable party structure at this election; instead the government was determined by a loose, shifting factional system. Although Robertson won the election, he relinquished the premiership to Charles Cowper to concentrate on passing land reform bills as Secretary of Lands.

Key dates

Results
{{Australian elections/Title row
| table style = float:right;clear:right;margin-left:1em;
| title        = New South Wales colonial election, 6 December 1860 – 24 December 1860
| house        = Legislative Assembly
| series       = New South Wales colonial election
| back         = 1859
| forward      = 1864–65
| enrolled     = 91,410
| total_votes  = 46,308
| turnout %    = 42.91
| turnout chg  = –9.63
| informal     = 48
| informal %   = 0.17
| informal chg = +0.09
}}

|}

References

See also
 Members of the New South Wales Legislative Assembly, 1860–1864
 Candidates of the 1860 New South Wales colonial election

1860
1860 elections in Australia
1860s in New South Wales
December 1860 events